Suzanne D'Mello, formerly known as Suzie Q, is an Indian playback singer of Bollywood films and other regional films. She also has voiced jingles for television advertisements.

Career
Over the years, Suzanne has worked with several music directors including A.R. Rahman, Pritam, Sajid Wajid, Ilaiyaraaja, Harris Jayaraj, Yuvan Shankar Raja, Salim–Sulaiman, Anu Malik, Bappi Lahiri and Vishal–Shekhar. She has sung up to 50 songs as a playback singer in Bollywood. In 2005, Suzanne sang her first playback song for music director Pritam – "Khalish" from the film ' Chocolate'. The song that first got her recognised was "Mahiya" from the film ' Awaarapan', for which she received her First nomination at the Stardust Awards in 2008. This was followed by a string of superhits like " Jee Karda" from 'Singh Is Kinng', "Pyaar Karke" from 'Pyaar Ke Side Effects', "Signaal" from 'Bhagam Bhag', "Meow" from 'Golmaal Returns'.

Her super hit "Aye Bachchu" from the Blockbuster 'Ghajini', earned her a nomination at the Tata Indicom Mirchi Music Awards 2009. Following this was yet another String of Super Hit Songs like "Surili Ankhiyon Wale" from 'Veer', "Rishtey Naatey" from 'De Dana Dan', "Chiggy Wiggy" from Blue where Suzanne collaborated yet again with A.R.Rahman and Australian Pop Star, Kylie Minogue, and "Naina Miley" from 'Robot'. Her Super Hit Songs that have topped the charts are "Challa" from 'Crook' and "No Problem" from 'No Problem'.
Besides Bollywood, Suzanne has a few Hits even in the South. She received great recognition and appreciation for her vocals on "Hosannah" from "Vinnaithaandi Varuvaaya" (Tamil), "Nalamdhana" from 'Silambattam' (Tamil) and currently for the song "Ayyayo Ayyayo" from 'Veera Parampare' (Kannada).

Besides Bollywood, D'Mello has two songs "Latika's Theme" and "Dreams on Fire" in the Oscar and Grammy Award-winning soundtrack of the Hollywood film Slumdog Millionaire (2008). She was also part of A. R. Rahman's Jai Ho tour.

Suzanne also tours with her Band performing Western music covering genres like RnB, Retro, Jazz, Pop, Country and Broadway.

Suzanne is also the Vocal Producer and Arranger for India's popular a cappella group Raaga Trippin'. The band covers both Western and Bollywood songs in Acapella which is simply music without instruments using the voice only. Suzanne has toured India and the world with these Bands and is currently working on her own album.

Discography

Filmography as Lyricist
 2009– Veer
 2009 – Main Aurr Mrs Khanna ( Hindi )
 2006 – Apna Sapna Money Money ( Hindi )

Awards
 Nominated: Vijay Award for Best Female Playback Singer (2011) – Mazhai Varum Arikuri (Veppam)
 Nominated: Apsara Award for Best Female Playback Singer (2010) – Aye Bachchu (Ghajini)
 Nominated: Tata Indicom Mirchi Music Awards Upcoming Vocalist Of The Year (2009) – Aye Bachchu (Ghajini)
 Nominated: Stardust Awards Best Debut Female Playback Singer (2008)- Mahiya (Awaarapan)

See also
List of Indian playback singers

References

External links

Living people
Bollywood playback singers
Indian women playback singers
Indian Roman Catholics
1976 births
Singers from Mumbai
Women musicians from Maharashtra
21st-century Indian singers
21st-century Indian women singers